Z88 may refer to:
 Z88 FEM software, a finite element software package
 Cambridge Z88, a 1988 portable Z80-based computer
 Vektor Z88, a handgun